Lauren Geremia (born 1982) is an American interior designer based in the San Francisco Bay Area.

Lauren Geremia was born in 1982 in Wallingford, Connecticut. Characterized as an "upstart designer for tech," her clients include Instagram (she designed its South Park office), and Dropbox (she designed its San Francisco office). Geremia graduated in 2004 from the Rhode Island School of Design with a degree in painting. Her diverse installations have included paper airplanes and tinted ping pong balls.

References

External links
Official website

American designers
Rhode Island School of Design alumni
American interior designers
Living people
People from Wallingford, Connecticut
American women interior designers
1982 births
21st-century American women